Tobler is a surname originating in Germany. Brought over through Ellis Island, the family carrying this name is now common in the United States.

This family line also is responsible for the invention of Toblerone chocolate (a crunchy, triangular chocolate bar created by a Tobler family in Switzerland).

People with the name
 Adolf Tobler (1835–1910), a Swiss-German linguist and philologist
 Anna Maria Tobler (1882–1935), a Swiss painter
 Douglas F. Tobler (born c. 1936), an emeritus professor of German and Holocaust history
 Johann Heinrich Tobler (1777–1838), a Swiss singer and composer
 John Tobler (born 1943), a British rock music journalist
 Li Tobler (1948–1975), a Swiss stage actress
 Ludwig Tobler (1827–1895), a Swiss linguist and folklorist, and the older brother of Adolf Tobler
 Robert Tobler (1901–1962), a far-right Swiss politician
 Ryan Tobler (born 1976), a Canadian professional ice hockey player
 Theodor Tobler (1876–1941), a Swiss chocolatier who co-created Toblerone chocolate
 Titus Tobler (1806–1877), a Swiss Oriental scholar
 Waldo R. Tobler (born 1930), an American-Swiss geographer and cartographer

References